Cândido Lorenzo González (23 September 1925 – 17 December 2019) was a Spanish Catholic bishop who served in Brazil. He was a member of the Order of Our Lady of Mercy (Mercedarians).

Lorenzo González was born in Spain and was ordained  to the priesthood in 1954. He served as bishop of the Roman Catholic Diocese of São Raimundo Nonato, Brazil from 1969 to 2002.

Notes

1925 births
2019 deaths
20th-century Roman Catholic bishops in Brazil
Spanish expatriates in Brazil
Spanish Roman Catholic bishops in South America
Roman Catholic bishops of São Raimundo Nonato